Guru das Agrawal, also known as Sant Swami Sanand and Sant Swami Gyan Swaroop Sanand (20 July, 1932 – 11 October, 2018), was an Indian environmentalist,  engineer, religious leader, monk, and professor.  He was the Patron of Ganga Mahasabha, founded by Madan Mohan Malviya in 1905.

He is notable for several fasts undertaken to stop many projects on the River Ganga. His fast in 2009 led to the damming of the Bhagirathi River being stopped.

Agrawal died on 11 October 2018, after fasting since 22 June 2018, demanding the government act on its promises to clean and save the Ganga.

Early life
Born to a farming family in Kandhla, Muzaffarnagar district, Uttar Pradesh, in 1932, he studied in local primary and secondary schools. He graduated in civil engineering from the University of Roorkee (now IIT Roorkee). While he was the member secretary of the Central Pollution Control Board during 1979 – 1980, he was also a visiting professor for environmental engineering at the University of Roorkee.

In July 2011, he became a Hindu sannyasi and Swami Gyanswaroop Sanand.

Environmental activism

Background
Despite numerous protests and representations by local citizens, 6 hydroelectric power-plant dams were planned, seeking clearance or already under construction, on a  stretch of the Bhagirathi River's  length. This run is from the river's source at the Gangotri Glacier to the remote town of Uttarkashi in the Himalayan foothills.  In pursuit of its energy intensive plan for economic growth, the Indian government had hastily pushed hydroelectric generating projects on the river, destroying what many describe as the traditional Indian ethos of worshipping and living in harmony with nature.

2009
Agrawal started a fast on 13 June 2009 at Uttarkashi. His demand was minimal and specific, i.e. to allow the flow of the Ganges in its original channel in this  stretch from its origin. This is the only stretch left where the Ganges can still be seen undisturbed by man. The free-running of the river is a crucial element of its sacred status.

Before his fast began in January, Agrawal said,  "The water ...(of the Ganges) is not ordinary water to a Hindu. It is a matter of life and death of Hindu faith".

An allegation by Uttarakhand Minister

Diwakar Bhatt, in a press conference, alleged that "It may be that the Central Intelligence Agency (CIA) of the US or Pakistan's Inter Service Intelligence (ISI) are behind these so-called anti-hydro projects in Uttarakhand, as by doing so they are hampering the development of the state and ultimately of India. So, they are traitors and should be opposed by people too."

2013
In mid-June 2013, Agrawal began his fast in the wake of the inactivity of National Ganga River Basin Authority. He stopped taking water on 21 September as his fast entered its 101st day. Due to government's apathy towards Agrawal's fast, three members of the national Ganga River Basin Authority, Rajendra Singh, Ravi Chopra and Rashid Siddiqui resigned.

2018
In February 2018, Agrawal sent an open letter to Prime Minister Narendra Modi urging him to stop environmentally unfriendly projects and ensure what he calls the 'aviral' flow of the river in the upper stretches of the river Ganga. He reminded the prime minister that "It will be four years in May when the Central government will complete four years in office, but nothing has been done so far for the cause of Ganga".

Agrawal had mentioned in the letter that if no action is taken by Ganga Dussehra (22 June 2018), he will go on fast-unto-death. He wrote another letter to PM on 13 June. After receiving no response from the government, he began his fast on 22 June at Haridwar.

On the 19th day of his fast, police evicted him from his fast venue to AIIMS Rishikesh. Based on a petition filed by Agrawal against forced eviction, Uttarakhand high-court stepped in and said he needs to be taken to hospital only if his health is in danger.

The government responded to Agrawal's fast via Nitin Gadkari (Union Minister for Water Resources, River Development and Ganga Rejuvenation), but it failed to resolve the impasse. Agrawal alleged that government is focusing on the cleaning river Ganga whereas his holistic vision ensures 'aviral-nirmal' Ganga.

On 13 August (53rd day of the fast), Agrawal was admitted to AIIMS again.

On 9 October (the 109th day of the fast), he stopped drinking water and refused to take medicine, water or any fluid/juice orally. However, he gave written consent to doctors for administering potassium orally and drip to provide 500ML saline fluid per day to maintain the minimum fluid and electrolyte needs of the body.

On 11 October (the 111th day of the fast), he died from starvation, aged 86.

Dam stopped
Work on the Loharinag Pala Hydro Power Project was stopped when Agrawal came close to dying on the 38th day of his fast in protest of the harnessing of the river Bhagirathi. In a letter dated 19 February 2009 to Agrawal, the Ministry of Power stated that it had ordered the immediate suspension of work on the Loharinag-Pala Hydropower Project on the Bhagirathi River. In response, Agrawal ended his fast the following day at 11:00 am. The Indian government agreed to speed up its inquiry into how electricity could be generated without the flow of the Ganges being impeded.

Agrawal's devotion to the River Ganges comes from his strong Hindu faith and conviction that India is staring at an unprecedented ecological and cultural catastrophe. As a citizen and a patriot, he has made it his life's mission to recall India to its traditional reverence for nature and to share that wisdom with the "developed" world. His sense of duty allows him to do no less.

National Ganges River Basin Authority
His campaign was taken up by leaders of the opposition party, who called for stopping all dam constructions upstream of the river. The Government of India was quick to commit itself to ensure perennial environmentally acceptable flows throughout the river and informing Agrawal of the same. The Government then went a step ahead and declared the Ganges a National River and set up the National Ganga River Basin Authority (NGRBA) as an empowered planning, implementing, and monitoring authority for the Ganges.

On 4 November 2009, in New Delhi, Prime Minister Manmohan Singh, also the chairman of NGRBA, directed the concerned officials to expedite of the National Ganges River Basin Research Institute (NGRBRI). The Centre for Environmental Studies and Technology (CEST), Banaras Hindu University was named the research institute that would act as knowledge centre for collecting and analysing all relevant data concerning the Ganges basin.

The objectives of NGRBRI are:
 To generate primary ecological data required by NGBRA for short and long-term planning of sustainable development of the Ganges River basin
 To investigate the hydrology and pollution problems along the river basin
 To study social, cultural and religious dimensions and develop eco-friendly technologies for sustainable development
 To act as the knowledge centre for the collection and analysis of all relevant data concerning the Ganges basin
 To create long-term models for future planning for maintaining water quality and its varied sustainable uses

On 10 February 2010, Union Minister of State (Independent Charge) for Environment and Forests Jairam Ramesh, addressing the GangesYamuna summit organised by the Nehru Memorial Library and Museum said: "I have said in the Parliament that India is a civilisation of rivers, and it should not become a land of tunnels." He said some new projects on Bhagirathi River would not be allowed. "There are no two opinions. There is just one mass opinion that the projects proposed on the river Bhagirathi, named Pala Maneri and Bhaironghati projects, will not be entertained further by the government."

References

External links
 Prof. Agrawal's Letter regarding 'Fasting Unto Death' Pramod-Van, Chitrakoot, M.P. Date: 14 April 2008, Re: My Intention of "Fasting Unto Death" for Conservation of Bhagirathi
 News clippings related to Agrawal's fast-unto-death
 G.D. Agrawal's Third and Final Letter to PM Modi on Saving the Ganga 
 ‘Ganges Crusader GD Agrawal Murdered,’ Aide Attacks Modi, Gadkari

1932 births
2018 deaths
Indian environmentalists
UC Berkeley College of Engineering alumni
IIT Roorkee alumni
Hindu activists
20th-century Indian engineers
IIT Kanpur people
Environmental engineers
People who died on hunger strike
People from Muzaffarnagar district